João da Silva (1 January 1946 – 12 March 1982) was a Brazilian boxer. He competed in the men's light welterweight event at the 1964 Summer Olympics. At the 1964 Summer Olympics, he defeated Chang Pin-cheng and Nadimi Ghasre Dashti, before losing to Eddie Blay.

References

1946 births
1982 deaths
Brazilian male boxers
Olympic boxers of Brazil
Boxers at the 1964 Summer Olympics
Boxers at the 1963 Pan American Games
Pan American Games silver medalists for Brazil
Pan American Games medalists in boxing
Light-welterweight boxers
Medalists at the 1963 Pan American Games
20th-century Brazilian people